Elections were held in the Australian state of Queensland on 13 June 1998 to elect the 89 members of the state's Legislative Assembly.

The result of the election was a second consecutive hung parliament, with the Labor Party forming minority government after receiving the support of independent Peter Wellington.  This election was the first in which One Nation supporters were elected to state Parliament, with the controversial party winning 11 seats. With nearly 23% of the vote, One Nation gained a higher percentage of the vote than any other third party (i.e. not Labor or Coalition) at the state or territory level since Federation. This was also the only election at which a third party gained more votes than both the Liberal Party and the National Party considered separately. Unlike in previous elections, no attempt was made to calculate the statewide two-party preferred vote (2PP), because the One Nation vote was so high that any 2PP result would have been meaningless.

A few months after the election, the One Nation member for Mulgrave, Charles Rappolt resigned.  Labor won the ensuing by-election, allowing it to form government with a bare majority of 45 seats.

The fact that the Coalition Government came to office as a direct result of the 1996 Mundingburra by-election instead of the general election the previous year, as well as its failure to win in its own right at the 1998 election, meant that the 1998 election was the fourth consecutive election victory for the Queensland Branch of the ALP, which had won every election since 1989.

Background

The previous state election had resulted in one of the narrowest margins of any Australian election. The Coalition won a slim majority of the two-party vote.  However, the Coalition's majority was wasted on massive landslides in its rural heartland, while Labor won 31 seats in Brisbane.  Labor Premier Wayne Goss' government thus clung to life by a single seat. This was brought undone when the Court of Disputed Returns ordered a new election in the disputed seat of Mundingburra, which the Liberals won on a modest swing.  The balance of power rested with newly elected Independent MLA Liz Cunningham, who announced her support for the Coalition.  Goss resigned, and Nationals leader Rob Borbidge was appointed as Premier.

The Borbidge government's popularity suffered in the later part of its term due to the federal Howard government's GST plans. Seeking to create a more definite majority, Borbidge called a new election on 19 May 1998. Although early polling showed the government to be strongly competitive with Labor, led by Peter Beattie, later polls saw Labor gain a substantial lead.

However, the debate between the two parties was rapidly sidelined by One Nation's emerging support. Formed in 1997 by federal Independent MP for Oxley Pauline Hanson, One Nation gained significant support on a platform of economic nationalism, anti-immigration sentiments and opposition to native title. Its platform was particularly well received in the Nationals' heartland of rural Queensland; indeed, at the time the writs were dropped, there had been fears over the past two years that One Nation would sweep the Nationals out of existence.  One Nation stood candidates in 79 seats, all largely political novices. The issue of preference allocations to One Nation, under Queensland's optional preferential voting (OPV) system, became a major campaign issue, with eventual poor results for the Liberals attributed to opposition from many of their traditional voters over their decision not to put One Nation last on preferences.

Borbidge had been well aware of the threat from One Nation. He tried to have One Nation preferenced last on Coalition how-to-vote cards. However, the national Liberal and National organisations pressured their Queensland counterparts to preference One Nation ahead of Labor. They apparently thought that One Nation's populism would peel off enough Labor voters to allow the Coalition to win another term.

Key dates

Results

One Nation won 11 seats and finished second (after preferences) in 23 seats.  Seven of One Nation's seats would have gone to Labor had it not been for leakage of Coalition preferences; had Labor won those seats, it would have been able to form government in its own right.

|}

Seats changing hands 

¶ Results for Mundingburra based on 1996 by-election.
 Members listed in italics did not recontest their seats.

Post-election pendulum

Polling 
Although the Coalition Government initially enjoyed strong levels of support subsequent to assuming office in 1996, support was quickly lost. From 1997, Labor opened a consistent, albeit narrow, lead in the polls and by 1998 Labor was enjoying a commanding lead. The Coalition was eventually disadvantaged by what was commonly deemed to be poor government performance and the rapid rise of One Nation support, which under the state's optional preferential voting, fractured the Conservative vote. The Coalition vote significantly plummeted, whilst Labor essentially withstood the swing to One Nation.

See also 
 Candidates of the Queensland state election, 1998
 Members of the Queensland Legislative Assembly, 1995–1998
 Members of the Queensland Legislative Assembly, 1998–2001
 Borbidge Ministry
 Beattie Ministry

Notes

References 

Elections in Queensland
1998 elections in Australia
1990s in Queensland
June 1998 events in Australia